Wu-Tang Clan is an American hip hop group from Staten Island, New York City originally composed of East Coast rappers RZA, Method Man, Inspectah Deck, Ghostface Killah, GZA, Ol' Dirty Bastard, Masta Killa, Raekwon, and U-God. Longtime collaborator Cappadonna became an official member in 2007.

Below is a list of songs recorded by the group.

List
Note: This list only includes songs credited to the "Wu-Tang Clan". It does not contain songs released by the individual members (not collectively credited as the Wu-Tang Clan) or songs released by their affiliates.

Notes

References

See also
 RZA discography
 GZA discography
 Ol' Dirty Bastard discography
 Method Man discography
 Raekwon discography
 Ghostface Killah discography
 Inspectah Deck discography
 U-God discography
 Masta Killa discography
 Cappadonna discography

Wu-Tang Clan